Charles Augustus Davis was a member of the Wisconsin State Assembly in 1881 and 1882. He was a Republican. Davis was born on November 6, 1828.

References

People from Waupaca County, Wisconsin
Republican Party members of the Wisconsin State Assembly
1828 births
Year of death missing